The Houston area population includes a large number of people with Chinese ancestral backgrounds. According to the American Community Survey, as of 2013, Greater Houston (Houston-Sugar Land-Baytown metropolitan area) has 72,320 residents of Chinese origin.

History
The first Chinese to enter Houston were 250 men coming in 1870 to do construction work. The Daily Houston Telegraph, in January of that year, stated that 247 Chinese docked in Galveston and went onwards in the region. The 1877 Houston City Directory listed three ethnic Chinese who worked in laundries, and the 1880 United States Census, the first to count the Chinese in Houston, showed 7 Chinese residents in there. Anthony Knapp and Igor Vojnovic, authors of "Ethnicity in an Immigrant Gateway City: The Asian Condition in Houston", described the Chinese population of Houston at the time as being small.

A report stated that circa 1901 Houston had 43 ethnic Chinese. The Chinese Exclusion Act was passed in 1902, and this convinced some ethnic Chinese to abandon Houston, as the same report stated that the population was down to 27 that year. Nester Rodriguez, author of "Hispanic and Asian Immigration Waves in Houston," concluded that most of the original men from 1870 left Houston. The first Chinese business district opened in the early 1900s. The city government had a "Chinese inspector" to look for traces of illegal activities related to vices, and Knapp and Vojnovic wrote that Houstonians at the time felt threatened by the ethnic Chinese presence.

During the Great Depression, some Chinese moved from rural Mississippi to Houston. They had operated small stores in Mississippi but they decided to move because many of their previous clientele, African-Americans, left the state during the Great Migration.

In the late 1930s there were fewer than 50 Chinese in Houston. At that time, most families of Chinese ethnicity operated restaurants and small groceries. They usually lived in residences behind their business or residences on the upper floors of the buildings housing their businesses. Due to racial discrimination they were unable to join labor unions or obtain high-quality jobs.

The number of Chinese in Houston increased to 121 by the start of World War II. During the war, many Chinese from southern states migrated to take advantage of the economy and the population increased by more than twice its size. In addition, the Chinese Exclusion Act was revoked in 1943, and the Chinese Communist Revolution replaced the government in the Mainland in 1949, causing additional persons to leave China. The revolution and repeal prompted additional assimilation among those in Houston. However, there were still under 1,000 persons of Chinese origin in 1950 in the area, with about 500 in the city. As ethnic Chinese could not gain entrance into professional schools at the time, the majority worked in businesses such as groceries and restaurants.

In the early 1950s the Chinese Merchants' Association moved into an area in the southeastern edge of Downtown Houston in what is today East Downtown, and this Chinatown grew during the 1970s. This area is currently referred to as the "Old Chinatown", and still contains some notable landmarks including the original Kim Sơn restaurant. Many Chinese businesses have since moved out, and the area is currently undergoing re-development.

In 1960 there were about 325 people in the city of Houston of Chinese origins. In the 1960s there were about 2,500 ethnic Chinese in the Houston area.

In the decade of the 1970s the first schools teaching the Chinese language appeared.

By 1983 there were about 30,000 people of Chinese origin in the Houston area. The first businesses of the new Houston Chinatown, located near Bellaire and Beltway 8, opened that year. The new Chinatown began to expand in the 1990s when local Asian-American entrepreneurs moved their businesses from older neighborhoods, especially the "Old Chinatown" in a search for more inexpensive properties. Knapp and Vojnovic stated that by in the 1980s Houstonians, along with local media outlets and the government agencies, "touted" them "as a
cultural and economic asset."

In 2000 the estimate of the Chinese-American population in Houston was 24,000. Moises Mendoza of the Houston Chronicle said in 2010 that "the population is thought to have grown by tens of thousands" since the 2000 estimate.

In 2001 Gordon Quan, a member of the Houston City Council, urged Asian Americans and Chinese Americans to become more involved in politics.

Geography
The first Chinatown in Houston was in the northern part of Downtown Houston. This shifted to what is the Old Chinatown by the 1970s as skyscrapers had replaced many of the buildings in northern Downtown. The New Chinatown began development in the 1980s.

Demographics
According to the 2010 Census there were 43,940 persons of Chinese/Taiwanese descent in Harris County, making up 15.7% of all Asians in the county. This figure includes those with origins from Mainland China, Taiwan, and Hong Kong. In 2010 the ethnic Chinese were the second largest Asian ethnic group in Fort Bend County, making up 21% of that county's Asians. As of the same year the ethnic Chinese were the second largest Asian ethnic group in Montgomery County.

Prior to the 1950s most Chinese in Houston were Cantonese people and often were not formally educated. In 1980 the ethnic Chinese were Harris County's largest Asian population. In 1990 there were 25,019 persons of Chinese/Taiwanese descent, making up 22.8% of the Asians in the county. By then the origins of ethnic Chinese, in addition to those from other parts of the U.S., were from Mainland China, Taiwan, Singapore, and Hong Kong. By 1990 the Chinese were Harris County's second largest Asian community after the Vietnamese. In 2000 there were 34,673 persons of Chinese/Taiwanese descent, making up 18% of the Asians in the county. If the Indian, Pakistani, and Bangladeshi populations of Harris County are combined into a single group, then in 2000 the Chinese were the third largest Asian ethnic group, slightly behind the second-largest Indian/Pakistani/Bangladeshi group. From 2000 to 2010 the ethnic Chinese population in Harris County grew by 27%.

Transportation
In 2013 Air China announced that it would begin nonstop service from Beijing to Houston. Xu Erwen, the consul general of the Consulate-General of China in Houston, said that the new flight "means a lot" to Houston's Chinese population.

In 2015 EVA Air began services to Taipei from Houston. Mayor of Houston Annise Parker stated that the growing Asian population of Houston made this flight an important one.

In 2004 China Airlines started a flight from Houston to Taipei stopping in Seattle, making it the first Asian carrier to fly to Houston. The airline stated that many Taiwanese companies had offices in Houston. In 2008, China Airlines announced that it was discontinuing service to Houston. When the China Airlines service was in operation the airline had a private bus service to Sugar Land and Southwest Houston Chinatown.

Media
Southern News Group, a publishing business owned by a Chinese-American, has its headquarters in Houston.

The Southwest Chinese Journal once served ethnic Chinese Houstonians.

By 2020 WeChat was commonly in use among recent Mainland immigrants.

Economy
Circa the 1870s the first Chinese laundry was established. Circa 1930 the first ethnic Chinese grocery business was Quong Yick, operated by C. Y. Chu. When Chinese laundries were no longer widely patronized, ethnic Chinese began operating restaurants; at the time not many non-Chinese in the area were interested in eating Chinese-style food, so initially restaurants served American food instead.

There was a bill in the Texas Senate to have property of deceased Asian Americans in urban areas be returned to the state instead of giving to heirs, and non-Asian owners of grocery businesses wished to remove competition and therefore sponsored the bill. However the bill was removed while in committee after two Asian Americans testified against the bill: they were Houston resident Edward King Tung (E. K. T.) Chen and San Antonio resident Rose Wu.

Institutions

The Taipei Economic and Cultural Office in Houston of Taiwan (Republic of China) is located in Greenway Plaza. The Taiwanese mission also has the Chinese Cultural Center in the Westchase district.

In the era before the Repeal of the Chinese Exclusion Act, the area Chinese consulate advocated for the rights of ethnic Chinese in the city as ethnic Chinese at the time had limited rights. The People's Republic of China operated the Consulate-General of the People's Republic of China in Houston in Montrose, from 1979 until 2020.

The Chinese Community Center (CCC, "Houston Chinese Culture Service Center"), an IRS 501(c)(3) organization and a United Way affiliate, is located in the Bellaire Chinatown. The facility opened in 1979 as the Chinese Language School. The CCC has several levels of English classes offered daily. As of 2006, at CCC about 80% of the students have university degrees, and the other 20% are the companions of the students with university degrees.

In the early years of the Chinese community, the Chinese Association of Houston and the On Leong Chinese Merchants Association, the latter having its meeting room in east Houston, were present. The first umbrella organization for ethnic Chinese was Wah Kew of Houston. E. K. T. Chen was elected president in the 1940s.

The Houston Lodge of the Chinese American Citizens Alliance (CACA) was established in 1954. Edward C. M. Chen, the son of E. K. T. Chen, wrote in "An American Chinese in Houston" that this chapter in the 1960s "came into national prominence". Edward C. Chen later was elected as the head of this chapter and was the youngest person elected as such.

The Houston Asian American Archive, founded in 2010 by Dr Anne S. Chao, is a research archive as part of the outreach arm of Chao Center for Asian Studies, Rice University, is housed at the Woodson Research Center, Fondren Library. The archive has documented oral history interviews of a significant number of Chinese Americans in Houston, in English, Mandarin or Cantonese.

Language
Historically the Mandarin-speaking and Cantonese-speaking groups were distinct, with the latter readily adopting American culture. Jessica Chew, author of "Vietnamese and Chinese American Cultures: Destination Houston," stated that the former "represent a more elitist culture".

Cuisine
There has been Viet Hoa (ethnic Chinese) influence on Vietnamese cuisine served in Houston. Suzanne Chew, mother of Jessica Chew, stated that the situation is a "Chinese mix".

The barbecue at Blood Bros. BBQ in Bellaire has Asian-American influences, with the co-owners being of Chinese ancestry.

Politics
In the era before the Repeal of the Chinese Exclusion Act, the area Chinese lacked political clout, relying on the Chinese consulate to advocate on their behalf. In 1995 ethnic Chinese in the Houston area had a preference for the Republican Party. By 2013, due concerns about discrimination against Asians and immigration policies and the lessening importance of anti-Communism, the political preferences of ethnic Chinese shifted towards Democrats and independents.

Beverley Clark, of mixed Chinese and African-American origins, was elected to the Houston City Council in 1989, being the first city council member of Asian origins. Martha Wong, elected to the council in 1993, was the first person of majority Asian origins to be elected to the council.

Education
In the era of de jure racial segregation in the United States ethnic Chinese in the Houston area were classified as white and therefore could get superior educational opportunities to the undergraduate level. However professional schools such as law, medical, and dental schools in the area rejected applications from ethnic Chinese, restricting their choices of careers. CACA successfully lobbied for the professional schools to accept ethnic Chinese.

E. K. T. Chen, the first university professor in the city of Chinese ancestry, was also the first graduate from the University of Houston of Chinese ancestry. He received his degree in the 1930s.

Religion

The Texas Teo Chew Temple is operated by the Teochew people, including those who originated from Vietnam.

Fo Guang Shan Chung Mei Temple is a Buddhist Temple located in Stafford, Texas.

A Taoist temple, Texas Guandi Temple is located in East Downtown. The temple was established in 1999 by a Vietnamese couple, Charles Loi Ngo and Carolyn, the former originating from China. They decided to build a temple to Guan Yu (Guandi) after surviving an aggravated robbery which occurred at their store in the Fifth Ward. They believed that Guandi saved their lives during the incident. A Vietnamese refugee named Charles Lee coordinated the donations and funding so the temple could be built; Lee stated his motivation was to thank the United States for welcoming him and saving his life when he arrived in 1978. The construction materials and architectural design originated from China. A representation of Buddha and a golden Lord Brahma originated from Thailand. The temple is open to followers of all religions, and it has perfumed halls. Ming Shui Huang was appointed volunteer manager in 2000.

In 1999 the Houston area had 350 Chinese Catholic families. Ascension Chinese Mission originated from a Chinese worship service that was established in the 1970s. The parish was created in 1988, initially operating out of a commercial center in the southwest Houston Chinatown area. It relocated to its current site in Spring 1991.

Recreation
The Lunar New Year (Chinese New Year) is celebrated in Houston, and Miss Chinatown is held at that time. Other recreational events occur during the holiday.

The Dragoneers youth social club for Chinese Americans met at Chinese Baptist Church.

Literature
Edward M. Chen compiled oral histories and wrote a chapter about the history of the ethnic Chinese published in the 1984 book The Ethnic Groups in Houston, edited by Fred von der Mehden. Edward Chen, in 1980, had organized an exhibit at UH about the Chinese community, titled "Centennial of the History of Chinese in Houston since 1880."

Notable individuals
Gordon Quan (Houston City Council member)
Martha Wong (Houston City Council member) - Houston Heights
KevJumba (Kevin Wu) - Comedian and actor
 (黃柏鈞) Chinese-American Movie Star
Cindy Yen Chinese-American Pop Star
Terry Chang Gee (died 2012) became a volunteer in Chinese American causes. Quan said "He's considered one of the pioneers of the Chinese community."
Yao Ming played for Houston Rockets from 2002 to 2011
Edward King Tung Chen (Former Deputy Counsul Republic of China and First Chinese Professor in Houston{ Prevented Internment of Chinese during the Korean War by working with FBI) [28]An Application for an Official Texas Historical Marker for Edward King Tung Chen 1909-1957 Newspaperman, Diplomat, Scholar, Professor, Patriot  American, Texan, Houstonian of Chinese Ancestry by Edward Chuck Ming Chen
Gene Wu (member of the Texas House of Representatives)

See also

 Demographics of Houston
 History of the Vietnamese Americans in Houston
 MetroCorp Bancshares

References
  - Table of contents
 
 
 
 
 Brady, Marilyn Dell. The Asian Texans. Texas A&M University Press, 2004. , 9781585443123.
 
 Klineberg, Stephen L. and Jie Wu. "DIVERSITY AND TRANSFORMATION AMONG ASIANS IN HOUSTON: Findings from the Kinder Institute’s Houston Area Asian Survey (1995, 2002, 2011)" (Archive). Kinder Institute for Urban Research, Rice University. February 2013.
 Rodriguez, Nestor. "Hispanic and Asian Immigration Waves in Houston." in: Chafetz, Janet Salzman and Helen Rose Ebaugh (editors). Religion and the New Immigrants: Continuities and Adaptations in Immigrant Congregations. AltaMira Press, October 18, 2000. , 9780759117129.
 Also available in: Ebaugh, Helen Rose Fuchs and Janet Saltzman Chafetz (editors). Rowman & Littlefield, January 1, 2000. 0742503909, 9780742503908.

Notes

Further reading
  - page 6 talks about Chinese arriving in the port of Galveston
 Harris County block book maps:
 West Houston Chinese Church (曉士頓西區中國教會) - PDF and JPG
 An Application for an Official Texas Historical Marker for Edward King Tung Chen 1909-1957 Newspaperman, Diplomat, Scholar, Professor, Patriot American, Texan, Houstonian of Chinese Ancestry by Edward Chuck Ming Chen

External links

 Chinese Community Center
 Chinese American Petroleum Association (CAPA)
 Chinese American Doctors Association of Houston (CADAH)
 Archives of the Southwest Chinese Journal

Asian-American culture in Houston
Chinese
History of Houston
Chinese-American culture in Texas
Houston
Houston